Kulgam district is a district in the Indian union territory of Jammu and Kashmir. It is located at a distance of  towards south-west of Anantnag. The district comprises block, tehsil and town of Kulgam.

Location
Kulgam is situated near the Pir Panjal Ranges, overlooking the left bank of Veshaw River, along a rough, hilly road from Larow. Nallah Veshav, which drains most of the northern face of Pir Panjal, is the main left-bank tributary of the Jhelum River and traverses through District Kulgam. The Veshev is broken into a number of channels to provide drinking water and irrigation for huge tracts of the district's land.

Roads connect to the neighbouring districts of Shopian, Pulwama, Anantnag, and Banihal.

History

Tazkira Sadat-i-Simanania, compiled by 13th-century scholar and poet Swaleh Reshi, gives the name of place as "Shampora". Syed Hussain Simnani later renamed it "Kulgam" (kul for 'clan' and gram for 'village' in Sanskrit). Simnani is said to have invited Mir Sayyid Ali Hamadani to Kashmir, with poets including Nund Rishi (Sheikh Noor-ud-din Noorani (RA)) and Lalleshwari. These poets and their disciples manifested the composite culture or Kashmiriyat, promoting and encouraging religious and cultural harmony even when viewed as heretics by other Asiatic countries.

The form of administration from Sher Shah Suri's reign led to creation of a Tehsil during Mughal Rule, through the aegis of Sheikh Hamza Makhdoom. This had jurisdiction encompassing Doru, Banihal, Gulabgarh, and Shopian. After time, constituent units including Pulwama, Shopian, and Reasi attained the status of district.

The area had been a hunting place for Mughal emperors and Dogra rulers, especially for Shahanshah Shah Jehan, who laid the "Chinar Bagh" and Maharaja Hari Singh, who discovered the virgin potential of sanctuary at Kutbal. The District is the birthplace of Sheikh Noor-ud-din Noorani, the founder of the Rishi order, and of the forefathers of Allama Iqbal and Jawaharlal Nehru.

Rebel groups

There has been insurgency in Kashmir since 1989. Beginning in the 1990s there is an upsurge of Rebel groups in the district, particularly the Lashkar-e-Taiba and Hizbul Mujahideen. the rebels encourage the populace to boycott elections.

Demographics
According to the 2011 census, Kulgam district has a population of 424,483. This gives it a ranking of 554th in India (out of 640). Its population growth rate over the decade 2001–2011 was 7.3%.	Kulgam	has a sex ratio of 	951 females for every 1000 males (this varies with religion), and a literacy rate of 60.3 percent. According to officials demographics is improving at a good rate.The density of population of the district is 1051 persons per km2 as compared to 124 persons for the state according to the Census figures of 2011.

At the time of the 2011 census, 91.91% of the population spoke Kashmiri and 6.32% Gojri as their first language.

Administration
District Kulgam was separated from district Anantnag, along with several other new districts, and made administratively separate from 2 April 2007.

Kulgam district currently consists of eleven blocks: Kulgam, D.H Pora, Devsar, Pahloo, Qaimoh, Kund, Manzgam, Frisal, Pombay, Behibagh, and D.K. Marg. This has not always been the case, in the 2008 reorganisation the district consisted of five blocks. Each block consists of a number of panchayats (English: 'assembly rule', a traditional system of local government).

The district has seven administrative units (Tehsils): Kulgam, Damhal Hanji Pora, Devsar, Frisal, Pahloo, Yaripora, and Qaimoh. Kulgam district has Five important towns: Frisal, Yaripora, Kulgam, Devsar, and Damhal Hanji Pora. Four of these have received municipality status; Damhal Hanji Pora has yet to be recognized as a municipality.

There are five police stations in the district at: Kulgam, Damhal Hanji Pora, Qazigund, Yaripora and Devsar, and six police posts at: Qaimoh, Frisal, Mir Bazar, Behibagh, Kund and Jawahir Tunnel.

Kulgam has two sub-divisions: Kulgam and Damhal Hanji Pora.

Politics
Kulgam district has 4 assembly constituencies: Noorabad, Kulgam, Homshailibugh, and Devsar. The parties of the current members of the legislative assembly (MLAs) are: Indian National Congress (INC) for Devsar, Jammu and Kashmir National Conference (JKNC) for Homshailibugh, Jammu and Kashmir Peoples Democratic Party (PDP) for Noorabad, and the Communist Party of India (Marxist) (CPI(M)) for Kulgam.

Homshallibugh J&K is 39th assembly segment has three municipal towns – Yaripora, Frisal and Qaimoh – which are also tehsil headquarters. Yaripora is an education and health block, while Qaimoh is agriculture as well as education and health blocks. Frisal is a community development block.

Road facility
Kulgam has following roads connecting it to various assembly segments and with NH1A (major district roads):
 Kulgam - Anantnag Main Road
 Kulgam - Qazigund NH44
 Kulgam - Yaripora 
 Kulgam - Aharbal via Nehama
 Kulgam - Aharbal via Damhal Hanji Pora 
 Kulgam - Damhal Hanji Pora via Adijan
 Kulgam - Shopian via Nillow
 Kulgam - Shopian via Nehama
 Kulgam - Devsar
 Kulgam - Wanpoh via Ban
 Kulgam - Ahmedabad via Khul

Health facilities
 District Hospital at Kulgam
 Sub district hospital at Yaripora
 Sub district hospital at Qazigund
 Sub district hospital D. H.Pora

Habitation and environment
The main source of livelihood in the district is agriculture and horticulture. The low-lying areas of Kulgam are very fertile for rice cultivation, and are considered as the 'Rice Bowl of Kashmir'. The higher elevations are known for production of apples. Livestock and sheep-rearing is a subsidiary occupation among the rural population, particularly in the higher elevations. 

Kulgam District is covered by the Pir Panjal mountain range on the southwest side, acting as a massive topographical protection. The area is significantly covered in forestation.

Tourism
Aside from places of spiritual interest, the district has tourist spots like Aharbal water fall on Veshev Nallah which is a place of sight-seeing in the extreme south-west. High pastures and meadows are also places of tourist attraction in the area from Kund to Ladigasan (ahead of Aherbal clefts). The District also has an abundance of natural water from springs such as Kausar Nag, Waseknag, Khee Nag, etc.

Photo Gallery

References

 
Districts of Jammu and Kashmir
Kashmir